Fredd Wayne (born Fredd Wiener; October 17, 1924 – August 27, 2018) was an American actor with a career spanning seven decades on Broadway, radio, television, movies, and recorded works.  He appeared on television as a guest star, and portrayed Benjamin Franklin, originally in his one-man show Benjamin Franklin, Citizen, on television, recordings, and live appearances.

Early life
Fredd Wayne was born in Akron, Ohio to working-class parents Celia (Mirman) and salesman Charles Theodore Wiener. Two days after graduating from John R. Buchtel High School he took a bus to Hollywood in hopes of working for cousin Lester Cowan who had produced My Little Chickadee and several Marx Brothers films.  He recalls sitting in the lobby of Columbia Studios for three days before Cowan dismissed him with: "I got nuthin’ for you, kid."  After Wayne's money and graduation watch were stolen, a neighbor who worked at Warner Brothers drove him to the studio where he was hired as a mail boy for $18 a week. This first Hollywood job, and the rush of delivering film to movie sets, trading "hellos" with Bette Davis, and watching John Garfield and Errol Flynn perform, ended when the U.S. Army called him in and asked his pre-draft occupation.  Without hesitation, he answered: "I was under contract to Warner Brothers Studio."

World War II 
 
Wayne was made a Special Services non-com (Entertainment Specialist) for the 253rd Infantry Regiment of the 63rd Infantry Division. For eighteen months, in addition to traditional military training, he ran movie projectors, wrote, produced and performed in soldier shows in Mississippi, attended courses at Fort McPherson, Georgia, and Washington and Lee University in Virginia (future director Arthur Penn was a classmate); Wayne also acted as booking agent of a hugely successful GI orchestra led by Ralph Cerasuolo, a sophisticated jazz violinist formerly known in New York City as "Leonardo of the Stork Club". Despite a 14-year age difference, they became close friends.

Elements of the 63rd Infantry Division, including Wayne and the band, landed in Marseilles, France, on December 8, 1944, and were rushed north to support Americans locked in the Battle of the Bulge. Wayne was assigned to GRO (Graves Registration Office) to retrieve fallen soldiers. On April 2, 1945, he discovered Cerasuolo’s body, killed by a single sniper shot to the forehead.

G.I. Carmen 
Shortly after VE Day, Wayne was directed to put together an entertainment for the men. In response to his notices, 45 combat veterans of his 253rd Infantry Regiment turned in rifles for grease paint to create G.I. Carmen – destined to become, with the exception of This Is The Army, the most successful G.I. show of World War II.  With half the cast as women in ill-fitting costumes and scraggly wigs, the show was to run for only three nights in Tauberbishofsheim, Germany but its raucous, bawdy humor, robust singing, and dancing made it a roaring success that the Army recognized at once.  In addition to writing, producing and co-directing duties, Wayne had to play the title role when no other G.I. would touch it. The cast included several pre-war professionals, including Hal Edwards, who had danced in 20th Century Fox musicals, and Ray Richardson, a tenor with the Chicago Lyric Opera. Most of Ralph’s band, now led by Marty Faloon, were onstage as well, among them guitarist Charlie Byrd. After raiding Stadttheater Heidelberg for colorful costumes, proper wigs, and scenery, the army sent the troupe on an extended eight-month tour throughout Germany, Belgium, France, Italy, and Austria including stops at leading theatres in Berlin, Brussels, Paris, Rome, and Vienna. The show closed in Nuremberg on January 24, 1946. GI Carmen’s cast was kept together throughout 142 performances before audiences totaling well over 250,000 G.I. and allied troops and countless civilians, including Gertrude Stein and Alice B. Toklas in Paris and Marlene Dietrich in Berlin.

Professional career 

Back in the states Fredd Wayne settled in New York with a job at J.C. Penney offices by day and acting classes at the American Theatre Wing after hours.  (Lee Marvin, James Whitmore, and Martin Balsam were classmates; Eileen Heckart and Jean Stapleton were among the volunteer actresses).  Roles there included Polonius in Hamlet at age 23.  As an usher at Broadway’s Alvin Theatre Wayne watched Ingrid Bergman star in Joan of Lorraine, and fetched tea for José Ferrer during the latter’s celebrated run in Cyrano de Bergerac.  (Ten years later for Universal’s Revue Productions, Wayne performed the character in a TV pilot called The Sword. It never sold.)  Following the Cyrano run Ferrer cast Wayne in his production of the Czech play The Insect Comedy whose performers included Ray Walston, Werner Klemperer, and Don Murray. Fredd Wayne’s big Broadway break came when he went to audition for Shakespeare’s As You Like It starring Katharine Hepburn but was mistakenly pulled in to read for the Johnny Mercer – Bobby Dolan musical Texas, L’il Darlin’.  His G.I. Carmen musical skills helped land a leading role.  Critical success led to more Broadway credits such as Not For Children by Elmer Rice and following Ray Walston as Luther Billis opposite Mary Martin in the original London production of South Pacific.  Wayne’s success in London – including a concurrent extended engagement at The Berkeley Cabaret –  was followed by a role opposite Gene Kelly in MGM’s Crest of the Wave, filmed in England and the Channel Islands.  It also led to American productions of South Pacific playing Billis opposite Gisele MacKenzie in Dallas, Vikki Carr in Kansas City, and Jane Powell in St. Paul, Minnesota.  Returning to New York Wayne co-starred opposite Ralph Bellamy in Oh Men!, Oh Women! and became embroiled in the Golden Age of Television, when dramas and comedies were not videotaped or filmed but miscues were part of the tension and grandeur of performing live before millions of people.  Wayne appeared in such shows as Playhouse 90, Studio One, Pulitzer Prize Playhouse, The Defenders, Kraft Theatre, Danger, We the People, Robert Montgomery Presents, The Victor Borge Show, and The Nurses. He also made six guest appearances on Perry Mason, all shot in Hollywood, including the role of murder victim Jack Hardisty in the 1958 episode, "The Case of the Buried Clock".

Benjamin Franklin, Citizen
Out of these creative years Fredd Wayne developed the role for which he's probably best known. The idea came to him while flying to New York from Los Angeles in 1964; he went straight to the New York Public Library from JFK to begin research and was directed to the Editor of The Papers of Benjamin Franklin at Yale University in New Haven, Connecticut.  After six weeks of study and appearances as Franklin on 'Tonight' and 'Today' shows he began breaking in his one-man show Benjamin Franklin, Citizen in upstate New York and Ohio.  By the time he reached Los Angeles the production was running smoothly and Wayne was hired to play Franklin in a two-part Bewitched on ABC-TV.Wayne’s Benjamin Franklin, Citizen also had a long run in Hollywood’s Ivar Theatre which led to a well received U.S. State Department tour of Europe and subsequent college tours throughout America during the Bicentennial era and beyond.  His work as Franklin on Bob Hope's America is 200 Years Old...And There's Still Hope! recorded on May 4, 1976, led to appearances in multiple roles on four subsequent Bob Hope Television Specials including an appearance as Brandon Tartikoff opposite Brandon Tartikoff.  Fredd Wayne has also appeared frequently as Franklin at IBM, GE, and other industrial conventions.  His recording of The Autobiography of Benjamin Franklin (Audio Partners) was selected as one of the top audiotapes of 1997.

Writings
As a writer Fredd Wayne’s articles have appeared in The New York Times, Playboy, The Los Angeles Times, Performing Arts, Westways, The Arizona Republic, and numerous other publications.  Wayne has titled his upcoming fictionalized memoir "Blinky's Great Adventure".

Death 
Wayne died at an assisted-living facility in Santa Monica on August 27, 2018, aged 93.

Selected stage credits

Filmography

Film

Television

Audio recordings

References

External links

1924 births
2018 deaths
20th-century American male actors
21st-century American male actors
American male film actors
American male stage actors
American male television actors
American male voice actors
Male actors from Akron, Ohio
Military personnel from Ohio
Writers from Akron, Ohio
United States Army personnel of World War II
United States Army non-commissioned officers